Eight ships of the Royal Navy have borne the name HMS Newcastle, after the English city of Newcastle upon Tyne:

  was a 50-gun fourth-rate ship launched in 1653.  She was rebuilt in 1692 and wrecked in 1703.
  was a 54-gun fourth rate launched in 1704, rebuilt in 1733 and broken up in 1746.
  was a 50-gun fourth rate launched in 1750. She foundered in a storm in 1761.
  was a 60-gun fourth rate launched 1813. She was converted to harbour service in 1824 and was sold in 1850.
  was a screw frigate launched in 1860. She was converted into a powder hulk in 1889 and was sold in 1929.
  was  a  light cruiser launched in 1909 and sold in 1921, being broken up in 1923.
  was a  light cruiser launched in 1937. She was laid down as HMS Minotaur, but was renamed in 1936. She was broken up in 1958.
  was a Type 42 (Batch 1) destroyer launched in 1975 and decommissioned in 2005 and placed into inactive reserve.  She was sold for scrap in 2008.
  will be a Type 26 frigate.

Battle honours

Porto Farina 1655
Santa Cruz 1657
Lowestoft 1665
Orfordness 1666
Schooneveld 1673
Texel 1673
Marbella 1705
Sadras 1758
Negapatam 1758
Porto Novo 1759
Spartivento 1940
Burma 1944–1945
Korea 1952–1953

Motto
 "Fortitudino Vinco" - (I conquer through strength)

See also
 , an  frigate of the Royal Australian Navy launched in 1992 and decommissioned on 30 June 2019.

Royal Navy ship names